Ronny Xin Yi Chieng (born 21 November 1985) is a Malaysian comedian and actor. He is currently a senior correspondent on Comedy Central's The Daily Show and the creator and star of the ABC sitcom Ronny Chieng: International Student.

Early life
Chieng was born into a Malaysian Chinese family in Johor Bahru on 21 November 1985. He grew up in both Singapore and the United States; from 1989 to 1994, he lived in Manchester, New Hampshire. 

In his youth, he was a Singapore Sea Scout. When he lived in Johor Bahru, Chieng commuted to Fuchun Primary School in neighbouring Singapore. He subsequently attended Pioneer Secondary School and Pioneer Junior College in Singapore. He attended the University of Melbourne in Australia, living at Trinity College and graduating in 2009 with a Bachelor of Commerce degree in finance and a Bachelor of Laws degree. He also obtained a Graduate Diploma in Legal Practice from the Australian National University in 2012.

Career

Chieng performed with Trevor Noah in 2013 at an Australian comedy festival in Melbourne. In 2015, he was asked to audition for the correspondent role on The Daily Show, which Noah hosted from 2015 to 2022. In July 2016, he was named one of 10 Comics to Watch by Variety. Three months later, he had a segment on The Daily Show in which he gave an expletive-laden criticism of a Jesse Watters clip on Fox News deemed by many as racist. He also revisited New York City's Chinatown neighborhood, where Watters had mocked residents, and conducted more respectful interviews in Mandarin and Cantonese. The video went viral and received coverage in The Washington Post and on Slate.

In 2017, Chieng began co-writing and starring in the sitcom Ronny Chieng: International Student, based on his own experience as a Malaysian student in Australia. It was developed for Comedy Central in America and ABC TV in Australia. In 2018, he made his film debut in Crazy Rich Asians, as Eddie Cheng, an obnoxious banker.

In 2019, his first stand-up special with Netflix, Asian Comedian Destroys America!, was released, directed by his Daily Show collaborator Sebastian DiNatale. In early 2021, Chieng signed a deal with Netflix for two additional stand-up specials and a "docu-comedy." He also appeared as the original character Jon Jon in the Marvel Studios film Shang-Chi and the Legend of the Ten Rings, and it was announced that Chieng and DiNatale will co-write a martial arts action-comedy film for Sony.

The new "docu-comedy", titled Ronny Chieng Takes Chinatown, was released in 2022 and co-stars YouTuber David Fung, with guest appearances from fellow Shang-Chi actor Simu Liu and professional NBA player Jeremy Lin. Chieng's second Netflix special, Speakeasy, was released on 5 April 2022.

In October 2022, Chieng commented on Rishi Sunak becoming Britain's first Asian Prime Minister during a Daily Show segment. He said, “I know everyone is excited that this is the first Asian prime minister, but let’s be clear: Indians are not Asians, OK? They’re still people — great people — just not Asian people.” Many internet netizens have criticized the joke, particularly Indians.

Personal life
Chieng has lived in New York City since moving to the U.S. in 2015. He is married to Hannah Pham. Although he lived in Australia for a decade, he does not have citizenship or permanent residency status there. He practises Brazilian jiujitsu and holds the rank of blue belt.

In 2018, Chieng joked that he had a fear of dogs on The Daily Show, but later clarified in an interview that he was "100% not scared of dogs". He is an avid collector of watches, an interest that first began with a Seiko 5 that he purchased during his university years in Australia. His watch collection was featured on an episode of the Hodinkee series Talking Watches and includes a rare variant of the Seiko Chronograph Ref. 6139-6010 (widely acknowledged as being worn by Bruce Lee) and a vintage GMT-Master Ref. 16753 "Root Beer". Another of his watches, a two-tone Rolex dated to 1984 that he inherited from his late father, appeared on an episode of Antiques Roadshow and was valued at $5,000.

Filmography

Comedy specials

Film

Television

Awards

Melbourne Comedy Festival

Sydney Comedy Festival

ARIA Music Awards

References

External links

Living people
People from Johor Bahru
People educated at Trinity College (University of Melbourne)
Malaysian people of Chinese descent
Malaysian emigrants to the United States
Malaysian emigrants to Australia
Malaysian Christians
1985 births
Malaysian male actors
Malaysian comedians